Raffaele Sansone (20 September 1910 – 11 September 1994) was an Italo-Uruguayan football player and coach from Montevideo, Uruguay, who played as a midfielder.

Club career
After beginning his career in Uruguay with Peñarol, Sansone spent over a decade playing club football for Italian club Bologna, winning the Serie A title four times, and the Mitropa Cup twice. After that he moved to Napoli where he played one game before retiring; he then became a manager.

International career
Sansone was also called up by the Italy national football team as an oriundo; he was allowed to play for Italy due to his parents being from Salerno. He turned out for the azzurri a total of three times, two of these times as starter in the silver winning 1931-32 Central European International Cup campaign.

Honours

Club
Bologna
Mitropa Cup: 1932, 1934
Serie A: 1935–36, 1936–37, 1938–39, 1940–41

International 
Italy
 Central European International Cup: Runner-up: 1931-32

References

Italian footballers
Uruguayan footballers
Uruguayan emigrants to Italy
Italy international footballers
Serie A players
Peñarol players
S.S.C. Napoli players
Bologna F.C. 1909 players
S.S.C. Napoli managers
Italian football managers
Uruguayan football managers
Uruguayan people of Italian descent
1910 births
1994 deaths
People of Campanian descent
Association football midfielders